Spain has a long history of combating domestic and international violence and of training units for special warfare or intervention. The following military and police units currently operate under a Special Operations mandate:

Navy
Fuerza de Guerra Naval Especial (FGNE) (Special Naval Warfare Force)

Army
Mando de Operaciones Especiales (MOE) (Special Operations Command)
 Grupo de Operaciones Especiales

Air Force
Escuadrón de Zapadores Paracaidistas (EZAPAC) 

Guardia Civil (Gendarmery)
Unidad Especial de Intervención (UEI)
Grupo de Acción Rápida (GAR)

National & Regional Police
Grupo Especial de Operaciones (GEO)
Grupo Operativo Especial de Seguridad (GOES)
Grup Especial d'Intervenció (Mossos d'Esquadra)
Berrozi (BBT) (Ertzaintza)

See also
 List of special forces units

Special forces of Spain